"Stand by Your Man" is a 1968 single by Tammy Wynette.

Stand by Your Man may also refer to:

 Stand by Your Man (album), 1969 album by Tammy Wynette
 Stand by Your Man (film), a 1981 American made-for-television biographical film
 "Stand by Your Man" (LL Cool J song), 1993
 Stand by Your Man (TV series), 1992 American sitcom
 Stand by Your Man (EP), 1982 EP by Lemmy and Wendy O. Williams
 "Stand by Your Man", a 1990 episode of The Golden Girls